The National Democratic Organisation was a political party in Trinidad and Tobago. It contested the 2001 general elections, received just 50 votes and failed to win a seat. The party did not contest any further elections.

References

Defunct political parties in Trinidad and Tobago